Dodoo may refer to:
 Afo Dodoo, Ghanaian footballer
 Francis Dodoo, Ghanaian athlete
 Joe Dodoo, English footballer
 Dodoo, Iran, a village in Hormozgan Province, Iran